This is a list of central banks and currencies of the Americas (Central America and South America and North America) .

See also
Currency
Economy of Latin America
Economy of South America

 
Economy of Central America
Banking in the Americas
Latin America